John C. Robinson (born October 17, 1972) is an American politician and businessperson from Maine. A Republican from Raymond, Maine, Robinson served in the Maine House of Representatives from 2004 to 2010. He moved out of the district and was superseded by fellow Republican Michael D. McLellan.

References

1972 births
Living people
Businesspeople from Maine
People from Raymond, Maine
Republican Party members of the Maine House of Representatives